The 2019 Tata Open Maharashtra was a 2019 ATP Tour tennis tournament played on outdoor hard courts. It was the 24th edition of the only ATP tournament played in India and took place in Pune, India, from 31 December 2018 through 5 January 2019. First-seeded Kevin Anderson won the singles title.

Singles main-draw entrants

Seeds

1 Rankings as of 24 December 2018

Other entrants 
The following players received wildcards into the singles main draw:
  Prajnesh Gunneswaran
  Arjun Kadhe
  Ramkumar Ramanathan

The following player received entry using a protected ranking into the singles main draw:
  Steve Darcis

The following players received entry from the qualifying draw:
  Félix Auger-Aliassime
  Simone Bolelli 
  Antoine Hoang
  Saketh Myneni

The following player received entry as lucky loser:
  Thiago Monteiro

Withdrawals 
Before the tournament
  Marin Čilić → replaced by  Pedro Sousa
  Saketh Myneni → replaced by  Thiago Monteiro

Doubles main-draw entrants

Seeds 

 1 Rankings are as of 24 December 2018.

Other entrants 
The following pairs received wildcards into the doubles main draw:
  Sriram Balaji /  Arjun Kadhe 
  Purav Raja /  Ramkumar Ramanathan

Finals

Singles 

  Kevin Anderson defeated  Ivo Karlović, 7–6(7–4), 6–7(2–7), 7–6(7–5)

Doubles 

  Rohan Bopanna /  Divij Sharan defeated  Luke Bambridge /  Jonny O'Mara, 6–3, 6–4

References

External links 
Official website

 
Maharashtra Open
Sports competitions in Pune
Tata Open Maharashtra
Maharashtra
Tata Open Maharashtra